Caribeginella is a genus of small sea snails, marine gastropod mollusks in the family Marginellidae, the margin shells

Taxonomy
Based on its taenioglossate radula, and despite its columellar folds, Espinosa & Ortea (1998) originally allocated Caribeginella to the family Triviidae. Fehse(2012) transferred Caribeginella to the Marginellidae in the synonymy of Hyalina, and suggested that the original authors had, during radula preparation, mixed its radula with that of a species of Triviidae. This view was rejected by Caballer et al. (2013), who treated Caribeginella as a valid marginelliform genus of uncertain suprageneric classification.

Species
Species within the genus Caribeginella include:

 Caribeginella flormarina Espinosa & Ortea, 1998

References

 Espinosa J. & Ortea J. (1998) Nuevo género y nueva especie de Molusco Gasterópodo maginelliforme (Mollusca: Gastropoda) con rádula taenioglossa. Avicennia 8-9: 113–116.

Marginellidae
Monotypic gastropod genera